Griškāni Parish is an administrative unit of Rēzekne Municipality in Latvia.

Parishes of Latvia
Rēzekne Municipality